Robinsons Malls is one of the largest shopping malls and retail operators in the Philippines. It was incorporated on September 9, 1997, by entrepreneur John Gokongwei Jr. to develop, conduct, operate and maintain the Robinsons commercial shopping centers and all related businesses, such as the lease of commercial spaces within the compound of shopping centers.

Robinsons Malls has also its branches in China under the Robinsons Galleria name.

In March 2016, John Gokongwei, Jr.'s son, Lance Gokongwei took over the leadership of Robinsons Malls following his retirement.

Malls

Philippines
The list of Robinsons Malls is based on their official website in order of their development.

"Robinsons Townville" brand

Other Malls

Future mall branches

China

"Robinsons Galleria" brand

See also
Robinsons Supermarket
JG Summit Holdings
SM Supermalls
List of shopping malls in the Philippines

References

Further reading
About Robinson, (September 7, 2007)
About Robinson Land, (September 7, 2007)

External links

 
Real estate companies established in 1997
Retail companies established in 1997
1997 establishments in the Philippines
Retail companies of the Philippines
Companies based in Quezon City
Shopping center management firms
Philippine brands